Fritz Bleiweiß (27 November 1911 – 27 June 1989) was a German racewalker, best known for his achievements in 50 kilometres race walk

In 1934 European Athletics Championships in Turin, Italy, he did not finish the race. At the 1936 Summer Olympics in Berlin, Germany, he reached 6th place, and 4th in 1938 European Athletics Championships in Paris, France.

Multiple medalist (including gold) in national championships.

He represented Berliner Athletik Klub and MTV Braunschweig.

Life records 
 50 kilometres race walk - 4:36:49 (1936)

References

Bibliography 
 
 Athlete profile in tilastopaja.org database

1911 births
1989 deaths
German male racewalkers
Olympic athletes of Germany
Athletes (track and field) at the 1936 Summer Olympics